Övertorneå Municipality is a municipality in Norrbotten County in northern Sweden, bordering Finland. Its seat is located in Övertorneå.

Until the Finnish War (1808–1809) Övertorneå and the Finnish Ylitornio were a single parish. Following the war, the eastern part of the municipality was ceded to Russia as a part of Finland. In 1870 a minor part of Övertorneå Municipality was split off, forming the rural municipality Korpilombolo (now part of Pajala Municipality). In 1969 Övertorneå and Hietaniemi municipalities were merged, forming the present municipality.

Many places in the municipality have both a Swedish and a Finnish name, in the local dialect of Finnish known as Meänkieli, one of the minority languages of Sweden.

Localities
There are four localities (or urban areas) in Övertorneå Municipality:

The municipal seat in bold

Smaller localities
There are nine smaller localities in Övertorneå Municipality:

Elections

Riksdag
These are the results of the elections to the Riksdag since the 1972 municipal reform. Norrbotten Party also contested the 1994 election but due to the party's small size at a nationwide level SCB did not publish the party's results at a municipal level. The same applies to the Sweden Democrats between 1988 and 1998. "Turnout" denotes the percentage of eligible voters casting any ballots, whereas "Votes" denotes the number of actual valid ballots cast.

Blocs

This lists the relative strength of the socialist and centre-right blocs since 1973, but parties not elected to the Riksdag are inserted as "other", including the Sweden Democrats results from 1988 to 2006, but also the Christian Democrats pre-1991 and the Greens in 1982, 1985 and 1991. The sources are identical to the table above. The coalition or government mandate marked in bold formed the government after the election. New Democracy got elected in 1991 but are still listed as "other" due to the short lifespan of the party.

Sights
Two old wooden churches in Övertorneå and Hedenäset. The church in Övertorneå has an organ from the 17th century.

Juoksengi is intersected by the Arctic Circle and is known as the "Arctic Circle Village" (Polcirkelbyn).

References

External links

Övertorneå Municipality – Official site
Ylitornio-Övertorneå – Tourist site

Municipalities of Norrbotten County
Meänkieli language municipalities